A friction motor is a simple mechanism to propel toy cars, trucks, trains, action figures and similar toys. The motor consists of a large flywheel which is connected to the drive wheels of the toy via a very low gear ratio, so that the flywheel revolves faster. The flywheel's axis is perpendicular to the direction in which the toy faces and moves. When the toy is pushed forward, the drive wheels engage the flywheel. Pushing the vehicle forward repeatedly spins this flywheel up to speed. When let go, the flywheel drives the vehicle forward. The flywheel stores the kinetic energy of the initial acceleration and propels the toy after it is released, by forcing the perpetual motor that revolves the kinetic energy.  

As the flywheel, unlike the spring of a pullback motor, is continuously rotating and not held, the motor may be "pumped up" by pushing the car repeatedly forward. The cars also typically work in forward and reverse. Some used a zip cord pulled from the vehicle body to accelerate the flywheel directly. Another system was the Turbo Tower of Power (TTP) in which air expelled from a hand-operated pump pushed turbine blades on the flywheel's rim.

These toys were especially popular in the 1960s to 1980s though they continue to be available today.

References

Toy cars and trucks
Mechanical toys